Agios Georgios (Greek: Άγιος Γεώργιος, for Saint George) may refer to the following places:

In Greece

In Achaea:
Agios Georgios Langoura, a neighbourhood in Patras
Agios Georgios Riou, older name for Rio
Agios Georgios, Aetolia-Acarnania, part of Missolonghi, Aetolia-Acarnania
Agios Georgios, Arcadia part of the municipality of North Kynouria, Arcadia
Agios Georgios, Boeotia, part of the municipal unit of Koroneia, Boeotia
Agios Georgios Sykousis, a village in the municipal unit of Kampochora, Chios
Agios Georgios, Corfu, a municipal unit in the island of Corfu
In Attica:
Agios Georgios (island) an uninhabited island in the Saronic archipelago, at the mouth of the Saronic Gulf
In Elis:
Agios Georgios, Andravida, part of the municipal unit of Andravida
Agios Georgios, Pyrgos, part of Pyrgos
Agios Georgios, Euboea, part of the municipal unit of Avlon, Euboea
Agios Georgios, Grevena, a village in the municipal unit Irakleotes, Grevena regional unit
Agios Georgios, Imathia, part of the municipal unit of Dovras, Imathia
Agios Georgios, Karditsa, part of the municipal unit of Mitropoli, Karditsa regional unit
Agios Georgios, Laconia part of the municipal unit of Voies, Laconia
In the Larissa regional unit:
Agios Georgios, Farsala, part of the municipal unit of Enippeas
Agios Georgios, Kileler, part of the municipal unit of Krannonas
In Lasithi:
Agios Georgios Lassithi, Oropedio Lasithiou, part of the municipality of Oropedio Lasithiou
Agios Georgios, Siteia, part of the municipality of Siteia
In Magnesia:
Agios Georgios Feron, part of the municipal unit of Feres
Agios Georgios Nileias, part of the municipal unit of Milies
Agios Georgios, Phocis, part of the municipal unit of Amfissa, Phocis
In Phthiotis:
Agios Georgios Domokou, a village in the municipal unit of Xyniada
Agios Georgios Tymfristou, a municipal unit
Agios Georgios, Preveza, part of the municipal unit of Filippiada, Preveza regional unit
Agios Georgios, Thessaloniki, a municipal unit in the Thessaloniki regional unit

In Cyprus

Agios Georgios, Famagusta (Turkish: Aygün), near Trikomo, Cyprus
Agios Georgios, Kyrenia (Turkish: Karaoğlanoğlu), near Kyrenia
Agios Georgios, Limassol
Agios Georgios, Nicosia, near Agia Marina
Agios Georgios, Paphos
Agios Georgios cemetery, Larnaca
Agios Georgios Kontou cemetery, Larnaca
Agios Georgios (refugee settlement), Larnaca

Other uses
, any of several ships